Parasolymus multiguttatus is a species of beetle in the family Cerambycidae. It was described by Stephan von Breuning in 1949.

References

Tragocephalini
Beetles described in 1949